Offie may refer to:

Off-licence, a U.K. shop licensed to sell alcoholic beverages for consumption off the premises
Carmel Offie (1909-1972), CIA official dismissed for homosexuality
 "The Offies", shortened name for the Off West End Theatre Awards